Willow Creek State Recreation Area may refer to 
Willow Creek State recreation Area (Alaska)
Willow Creek State Recreation Area (Nebraska)